Chámeza is a town and municipality in the Department of Casanare, Colombia.

Climate
Chámeza has a very wet tropical rainforest climate (Af).

References

Municipalities of Casanare Department